The Central Archive is an academic institution in Berlin, Germany linked with the collections and administrative departments of the Berlin State Museums. It functions as the primary site for research and preservation of the Museums' "memory" and its primary source documents. Its holdings span the history of the State Museums of today back to the former Royal Museums of the Kingdom of Prussia and German Empire. Through consolidation, the holdings have become one of the most important Art History archives in Germany.

The Archive's mission is to handle these materials according to archive-specific principles, to ensure long-term preservation and to make them accessible. In response to increased demand for information and documentation about the history of the Museums' collections, a location on Museum Island is open to the public, offering holdings of the archive for researchers as well as answering queries.

History
A formal archive for collecting and managing the records of the Royal, later the National Museums in Berlin was established in 1960 at the Pergamon Museum, then located in East Berlin. In 1965 another  archive was established at the Alte Nationalgalerie as a documentation facility in the field of Art History. It collected information on 19th and 20th Century art and even the so-called "Degenerate art". In the mid-80s, a Building Archives of the National Museums established, which collected the construction documents of each building. In 1987, these three archives were merged to become the Central Archives of the National Museums of Berlin. Following German reunification, the archives became part of the Berlin State Museums under the auspices of the
Prussian Cultural Heritage Foundation.

In spring 2004 the Werner Kittel Archive, one if the most comprehensive Art History archives in Germany, was transferred to the Central Archive. It holds archival material on over 450,000 artists.

The Collection
The archive is divided into the following sections:

Transaction Records of the Royal Museums and  National Museums in Berlin up to 1945.
Transaction Records of the Berlin State Museums after 1945 and those of the Prussian Cultural Heritage Foundation after 1948/1957
Records of Associations and Commissions
Personal Papers of museum staff, including depositions
Archived Collections

References

External links
 Berlin State Museums, in English
 Werner Kittel Archive, in German

Prussian Cultural Heritage Foundation
Museums in Berlin
Archives in Germany